Charles E. Alden (fl. 1906) was an obscure inventor mentioned in a 1906 edition of the New York World  who was claimed to have created the idea of a vest pocket telephone, a device that was the precursor of the cell phone. An article entitled: “Ingenious Yankee Invents Simple Telephone System” appeared in the May 24, 1907 edition of L’Abeille de la Nouvelle-Orléans–a New Orleans newspaper. He envisioned the idea in 1906, sixty-seven years before the first hand-held mobile phone was demonstrated by Dr Martin Cooper of Motorola in 1973. In 1907, Alden invented and tested a wireless, remote controlled boat off the coast of Martha's Vineyard. This boat was said to have “lifted its own anchor, blows its own whistle, signals, fires a gun and steers” all while the operator is controlling it on shore.

References 

American inventors
American futurologists
20th-century American people
Year of birth missing
Year of death missing